Flemming Rasmussen (born 12 March 1968) is a former strongman competitor and powerlifter from Denmark.  He competed in the World's Strongest Man contest several times, finishing in 5th place in 1995 and 4th in 1996. His best result came in 1997 when he finished 2nd, but he had been leading by four points over eventual champion Jouko Ahola before the final two events. However, sixth place finishes in both of the final two disciplines allowed Ahola to overturn the deficit. Flemming won the title of Denmark's Strongest Man 7 times from 1995-2000 and in  2003, and won the Danish Powerlifting title in 1993 and 1994. Before competing as a strongman, Rasmussen was Danish ten-pin bowling champion.

References

1968 births
Living people
Danish powerlifters
Danish strength athletes
People from Silkeborg
Sportspeople from the Central Denmark Region